Mika Antero Alatalo (born June 11, 1971 in Oulu, Finland) is a former professional ice hockey forward.

Playing career
He played 152 games in the National Hockey League for the Phoenix Coyotes. He has most recently played for Herlev Hornets and formerly for HC Thurgau. He last played for Hockey Club Pustertal-Val Pusteria in Italy's Serie A.

Career statistics

Regular season and playoffs

International

External links
 
 

1971 births
Living people
Finnish ice hockey left wingers
HC Pustertal Wölfe players
Herlev Hornets players
Ice hockey players at the 1994 Winter Olympics
KooKoo players
Lukko players
Luleå HF players
Medalists at the 1994 Winter Olympics
Olympic bronze medalists for Finland
Olympic ice hockey players of Finland
Olympic medalists in ice hockey
Phoenix Coyotes players
SC Langnau players
Sportspeople from Oulu
HC TPS players
Winnipeg Jets (1979–1996) draft picks